Abdulfatai Omotayo Buhari is a Nigerian senator representing Oyo North Senatorial district. He was first elected during the 2015 senatorial elections and re-elected at the 2019 senatorial elections.

He has served as a commissioner for Local Government and Chieftaincy Matters of Oyo State and as the chairman of the Senate committee for ICT and cybercrime. In 2003, he served as a member of the House of Representatives representing Ogbomoso North, Ogbomoso South and Oriire Federal Constituencies.

He is the current chairman of the senate committee on land and marine transport.

References 

Year of birth missing (living people)
Living people
All Progressives Congress politicians
People from Oyo State
Nigerian politicians
Members of the Senate (Nigeria) by state
Yoruba people